is a collection of 8 short stories in manga format (tankōbon) written and illustrated by Yuu Watase in 1994, and subsequently distributed in Japan by Shogakukan in January 1995 as part of the Flower Comics  collection. This tankōbon is made up of: Kiss Me With Mint, Genseika, Seal Of Flower, Yamato Nadeshiko Romance, Sand Tiara, Hatsuki Triangle, 700 Days of Blue, and Jewel in Heart respectively. Among these, Yuu Watase chose "Kiss Me With Mint" to be the main story of this collection.

"Mint de Kiss Me "(ミントで Kiss me) plot 
Misono Kari is a high school student who is in love with her teacher, Toono. She tries every means to get close to him, including trying to use a magic spell. According to the magic spell, if you kiss someone while eating mint candy, you and that person can "be one." After school, Misono tries to kiss Toono but instead kisses Shindou, a boy who was bothering her. The spell works, but not as intended: Misono and Toono "become one" when Misono's spirit leaves her body and enters Shindou's body.

References

External links

 
 Mint de Kiss Me (manga) at MyAnimeList

1994 manga
Shogakukan manga
Shōjo manga
Yuu Watase